Chkhortoli Church (XI-XIX Centuries) is a church on right bank of Chkhortoli river in the village of Chkhortoli, Gali Municipality, Autonomous Republic of Abkhazia, Georgia.

History 
The church was built in the 11th-13th centuries. The construction represents an 18th-19th century hall church with an old, 11th century foundation and an overhanging apse. The church has a gate on the western side. The upper part of the gate represents a big arch open both from the façade and the church's inner part. Three large windows are located in the altar. An arched niche is on the northern side of the altar. Southern and northern walls also have windows. The western door is arched-shaped and other doors have a rectangular shape. The interior walls have two arches that are situated on a standing out sharp pilaster. The pilasters are ending with decorated (ornamented) capitals. The church roofing is totally demolished. All walls are on the same level and there is no sign of a vault. Apparently, the church had a girder roofing.

External links
 Chkhortoli Church (XI-XIX Centuries)

References 

Churches in Abkhazia
Immovable Cultural Monuments of National Significance of Georgia